is a 1968 Japanese science fiction horror film directed by Hajime Sato. The film is loosely based on the 1967 tokusatsu series Gokemidoro, produced by P Productions.

Plot
After a radio message about a bomb threat against the plane, co-pilot Sugisaka checks the passengers' bags for the bomb, which are cleared apart from one man who had no bag. Stewardess Kuzumi opens an unaccompanied suitcase under a bench, finding a rifle. The man pulls a gun on Sugisaka and orders the pilot to fly to Okinawa. He shoots out the plane's transistor radio just as it breaks the news about a UFO over Japan with Japanese and U.S. Air Force fighters in pursuit. A luminous object streaks past overhead, knocking out the airplane's control and causing an engine fire to erupt. The aircraft crashes on an uncharted deserted island.

Only a handful of people survive the crash: Sugisaka; Kuzumi; Mrs. Neal, an American widow; Senator Mano of the Constitutional Democratic Party; weapons exporter Tokiyasu and his wife Noriko; psychiatrist Momotake; space biologist Professor Sagai; and the young man who called in the bomb threat. The hijacker suddenly sits up, grabs Kuzumi, and escapes into the jungle, encountering the spaceship. Kuzumi hides, but the hijacker steps into a clearing and walks to the spaceship as if he was called to it. A dark blob oozes towards the hijacker, whose forehead is split wide open, causing Kuzumi to scream and pass out.

Sugisaka finds the unconscious Kuzumi and carries her back to the plane. Dr. Momotake later hypnotizes her to recount the events in the jungle. The teenager who called in the bomb threat attacks Dr. Momotake, who falls off the cliff where he comes across the hijacker, who then kills him by draining his blood.

As the survivors discuss finding water, a knock at the door is heard. Sugisaka opens it to find the hijacker lying on the ground with a big scar on his forehead. The survivors carry the hijacker inside and dress his wound. Tokiyasu then uses the rifle to force everyone out of the plane and locks himself safely inside with the hijacker. Right after, Tokiyasu's screams are heard, and the door unlocks. Everyone goes inside to find Tokiyasu dead, drained of all blood. The hijacker appears and carries Noriko off to the spaceship. At sunrise, Noriko is seen standing on a ridge. She speaks, but with the voice of the alien, the Gokemidoro. It is revealed that the Gokemidoro has invaded Earth, intending to eradicate the human race. Noriko then plunges off the ridge, shriveling into a cadaver.

The passengers argue about whether extraterrestrials would invade Earth. Professor Sagai theorizes that the hijacker turned into a vampire. Mano challenges them to prove there are vampires, causing the others to plan to sacrifice someone to the Gokemidoro. The survivors shove the teenager outside as the hijacker slowly advances towards him. The teenager pulls out the bomb he has been hiding and threatens to blow up the plane unless they let him back in. They do not, and the teenager triggers the bomb, killing himself and blowing a large opening in the airplane, wounding Professor Sagai. Mano runs off with Mrs. Neal. When the hijacker catches up with them, Mano pushes Mrs. Neal to the hijacker to save himself. Mrs. Neal shoots several times but misses. The hijacker kills her.

Mano escapes back to the plane with the hijacker right behind him. The remaining survivors leave the plane to help Mano, but he runs past them, locking the plane door behind him. While Mano watches from inside the airplane, Sugisaka tosses a bucket of airplane fuel at the hijacker, then sets him on fire.

The Gokemidoro crawls out of the burning hijacker, creeps in the plane, and enters Professor Sagai's forehead. Sagai drains Mano, then turns to Sugisaka and Kuzumi, who escape. Sagai follows until he is swept off a hill by a landslide. Sugisaka and Kuzumi keep running while Sagai goes back to the spaceship. Once there, the Gokemidoro crawls out, reducing Sagai to dust.

Sugisaka and Kuzumi reach a highway, finding every human in the cars and the city dead. The Gokemidoro informs them that no one will be spared.

In the epilogue, Sugisaka and Kuzumi are wandering on rocky terrain. In orbit around Earth, a whole fleet of Gokemidoro spaceships await the order to attack.

Cast 
 Teruo Yoshida as Ei Sugisaka
 Tomomi Sato as Kazumi Asakura
 Eizo Kitamura as Gôzô Mano
 Hideo Ko as Hirofumi Teraoka
 Kathy Horan as Mrs. Neal
 Yuko Kusunoki as Noriko Tokuyasu
 Harold Conway as the Ambassador
 Kazuo Kato as Dr. Momotake
 Hiroyuki Nishimoto as the airplane captain
 Nobuo Kaneko as Mr. Tokuyasu
 Masaya Takahashi as Toshiyuki Saga
 Toshihiko Yamamoto as Matsumiya
 Keiichi Noda as Gokemidoro (voice)

Release
Goké, Body Snatcher from Hell was released in Japan on 14 August 1968. It was released by Pacemaker Films in the United States in 1977. When released to U.S. television and home video, the film was re-titled Body Snatcher From Hell.

It was released on DVD by the Criterion Collection in a box set on November 20, 2012. Other films in the box set included The X from Outer Space, The Living Skeleton, and Genocide.

Reception

An article on Turner Classic Movies written in 2006 calls Goké, Body Snatcher from Hell a "masterpiece" of 1960s sci-fi that has won a cult following.

In a contemporary review, the Monthly Film Bulletin reviewed an 83-minute English-dubbed version of the film. The review described the film as an "Uninspired mélange of flying saucers and vampirism" that was "woodenly directed and bogged down by long stretches of melodramatic dissension among the characters which acts as an uneasy springboard for much preaching and moralizing about why mankind deserves to be taken over by invaders from another world."

See also
 List of horror films of 1968
 List of Japanese films of 1968

Notes

References

Footnotes

Sources

External links
 
 
 

1968 films
1968 horror films
1960s science fiction horror films
Japanese aviation films
1960s Japanese-language films
Tokusatsu films
Alien invasions in films
Mass murder in fiction
Japanese science fiction horror films
Shochiku films
Films scored by Shunsuke Kikuchi
Films set on airplanes
Japanese vampire films
1960s exploitation films
1960s Japanese films